Paul Dorien McJulien (born February 25, 1965) is a former American football punter in the National Football League. He played college football at Jackson State University. He played two seasons for the Green Bay Packers (1991-1992) and one for the Los Angeles Rams (1993).

References

1965 births
Living people
Players of American football from Chicago
American football punters
Jackson State Tigers football players
San Diego Chargers players
Seattle Seahawks players
Green Bay Packers players
Los Angeles Rams players